Nawabganj is an upazila of Dinajpur District in the Division of Rangpur, Bangladesh.

Geography
It has 34999 households and total area 314.68 km2.
Dighipara, a village of Nawabganj Upazila: 60 Thousand metric tonnes of coal are stored.

The upazila is bounded by Parbatipur upazila on the north, Ghoraghat and Hakimpur upazilas on the south, Pirganj (Rangpur), Mithapukur and Badarganj upazilas on the east, Birampur and Phulbari upazilas on the west.

Demographics
As of the 1991 Bangladesh census, Nawabganj has a population of 170301. Males constitute 51.28% of the population, and females 48.72%. This Upazila's eighteen up population is 88690. Nawabganj has an average literacy rate of 24.2% (7+ years), and the national average of 32.4% literate.

Economy
Dighipara a small village under Putimara Union, is the largest deposit of coal, mainly anthracites and silica in Bangladesh. BAPEX have already surveyed the underground deposits in 1994. Villagers want well-justified decisions that facilitates both the country, environment and residents nearby. As controversial dispute in Phulbari Coal mine project with Asia Energy, Government of Bangladesh and local people; Dighipara will be a free, transparent solution for both the energy crisis and demands of the local people.

Points of interest 

A well balanced ecosystem in the 517.61 hectare Ashorar Bill and Shal forests is a tourist attraction. It includes a unique canal system and a 3–4 km region with ambient atmosphere. Guest birds are available year-round. It was declared as National forest under the Name "Nawabganj National Forest" at 24/10/2010 by the People's Republic of Bangladesh.

Administration
Nawabganj Upazila is divided into Nawabganj Municipality and nine union parishads: Bhaduria, Binodnagar, Daudpur,  Golapgonj, Joypur, Kushdaha, Mahmudpur, Putimara, and Shalkhuria. The union parishads are subdivided into 212 mauzas and 272 villages.

Education
There are several number of educational institutions including degree colleges, mohila degree colleges, high schools, madrashas, and primary school. Aftabganj Degree College, Daudpur Degree College, Daudpur M.L. High School, Hatisal Fazil Madrasha, Boalmari/Kanchdoho Fazil Madrasha, Raghobendrapur Alim Senior Madrasah are noted ones. All these institutions provide qualified sound education.

References

Upazilas of Dinajpur District, Bangladesh